Žukovo is a settlement in the hills north of Velike Poljane in the Municipality of Ribnica in southern Slovenia. The entire municipality is part of the traditional region of Lower Carniola and is now included in the Southeast Slovenia Statistical Region.

References

External links
Žukovo on Geopedia

Populated places in the Municipality of Ribnica